Grigory Pulyayev (born 18 July 1971) is a Uzbekistani wrestler. He competed in the men's Greco-Roman 68 kg at the 1996 Summer Olympics.

References

1971 births
Living people
Uzbekistani male sport wrestlers
Olympic wrestlers of Uzbekistan
Wrestlers at the 1996 Summer Olympics
People from Samarkand
Asian Games medalists in wrestling
Wrestlers at the 1994 Asian Games
Wrestlers at the 1998 Asian Games
Asian Games silver medalists for Uzbekistan
Asian Games bronze medalists for Uzbekistan
Medalists at the 1994 Asian Games
Medalists at the 1998 Asian Games
20th-century Uzbekistani people
21st-century Uzbekistani people